Labovë e Kryqit (Labovë of the Cross) is a settlement in Southern Albania, which has taken the name of its famous church, the Dormition of the Theotokos Church. It consists of two neighbourhoods: Labovë e Poshtme (Lower Labovë) and Labovë e Sipërme (Upper Labovë). To distinguish it from its neighbour Labovë e Madhe (Labovë e Vangjel Zhapës), the village is known by two names Labovë e Kryqit, in reference to a nearby old Byzantine church and Labovë e Libohovës (Labovë of Libohovë). It is part of the Qendër Libohovë subdivision of the Libohovë municipality, in Gjirokastër County, southern Albania.

Name 
Afanasy Selishchev (1931), derived Labovë from the Slavic hleb’ meaning bread and Xhelal Ylli (1997) states that is not semantically possible. The suffix -ov-a is a Slavic formation. The root word of the toponym might denote the following: a Lab, an inhabitant of Labëria, the proto-Slavic *lap’ for "leaf", or Bulgarian words for plants like lop (petasites), lopen (verbascum), lopuh (arctium tomentosum). The proto-Slavic reflex a in the placename became o in Slavic, while in Albanian its a, with an Albanian sound change of p to b. If the toponym is derived from Lab, Ylli suggests it would mean the incoming Slavs encountered the earlier residents there, the Labs.

Demographics 
In the interwar period Nicholas Hammond passed through the area and described Labovë as a place of mixed speech (Albanian and Greek), with Albanian as the mother tongue. In fieldwork done by Leonidas Kallivretakis in 1992, Labovë e Kryqit had an exclusive Albanian Orthodox population.

Notable people
Vasileios of Dryinoupolis metropolitan bishop and member of the provisional Government of Northern Epirus (1914).

References

Populated places in Gjirokastër